The  is a private railway in Chiba Prefecture, Japan. It connects Narashino and Matsudo. It is a subsidiary of Keisei Electric Railway.

It has the following bus company subsidiaries.
 Funabashi Shin-Keisei Bus
 Matsudo Shin-Keisei Bus

Lines
The company operates one line, the 26.5 km Shin-Keisei Line, between Matsudo and Keisei Tsudanuma.

Rolling stock
 8800 series (since 1986)
 8900 series (since 1993)
 N800 series (since 2005)
 80000 series (since 27 December 2019)

All trains are based at Kunugiyama and Tsudanuma Depots.

Former rolling stock
 800 series (1971 – July 2010)
 8000 series (1978 – November 2021)

History
After World War II, the ownership of the right-of-way of an uncompleted Imperial Japanese Army military railway line was transferred to Keisei. Shin-Keisei was established as a subsidiary of Keisei on 23 October 1946 to construct and operate the line.

In June 2014, the company unveiled a new corporate image with a new corporate logo and "gentle pink" corporate colour scheme and train livery. The company's entire fleet of trains was scheduled to be reliveried in the new colour scheme, with the first train, an 8800 series set entering service from 29 August 2014.

References

External links

  
  

Railway companies of Japan
Companies based in Chiba Prefecture
Japanese companies established in 1946
Railway companies established in 1946